asR3 is an archeal small RNA identified in seven Pyrobaculum species. The genus-specific nature can indicate this could be recent, stable adaptation. asR3  binds to the 3′-end of the tpi gene (triose-phosphate-isomerse).  The tpi mRNA has a conserved structural element  located close to the stop codon. Binding of the asR3 may be able to compete against the formation of the tpi element  structure and this may modulate the function of this highly conserved element.

References

See also 
Other archaeal sRNAs:
Archaeal H/ACA sRNA
Methanosarcina sRNA162

Non-coding RNA